At the 1928 Winter Olympics, in St. Moritz, Switzerland, a military patrol competition was held. Because of a snowstorm the night before the competition, the start of the event was delayed 45 minutes to the cleaning up of the track. The competition was contested over a 30 km distance with an elevation difference of 1100 metres. The starting point was on a height of 2,108 metres, the highest point at 2,877 metres, and the goal in the valley at 1,850 metres. Nine countries with 36 military patrol runners participated in this event.

The event was held on Sunday, February 12, 1928.

References
 Swiss Olympic Committee St. Moritz 1928, 1928. pp.12-13 (digitized version) 
 Swiss Olympic Committee Résultats DES concours DES IImes jeux Olympiques d'Hiver, 1928. (digitized version)

External links
 

1928 Winter Olympics events
1928
1928 in biathlon
1928 in cross-country skiing
1928 in military history
Men's events at the 1928 Winter Olympics